Whitney is a family of humanist sans-serif digital typefaces, designed by American type designer Tobias Frere-Jones. It was originally created for New York’s Whitney Museum as its institutional typeface. Two key requirements were flexibility for editorial requirements and a design consistency with the Whitney Museum's existing public signage.

Typographical context 
Whitney was created in 2004 by the foundry of Hoefler & Frere-Jones. Whitney bridges the divide between editorial mainstays such as News Gothic (1908), which is an American gothic typeface, and signage application standards such as Frutiger (1975), which is a European humanist typeface. Moreover, “its compact forms and broad x-height use space efficiently, and its ample counters and open shapes make it clear under any circumstances.”

Variants 
 Whitney Light
 Whitney Light Italic
 Whitney Book
 Whitney Book Italic
 Whitney Medium
 Whitney Medium Italic
 Whitney Bold
 Whitney Bold Italic
 Whitney Black
 Whitney Black Italic

Use
 Whitney Museum 
 Discord (until 2022)
 The Walt Disney Company (until 2012)
 SketchUp
 Bridgewater Associates (one of the largest hedge funds in the world)
 Kodak
 Boston University
 University of Texas Health Science Center at San Antonio
 New Zealand Transport Agency Publications and advertising
 NYU Langone Medical Center Stationery Guidelines
 Canadian Partnership for Consumer Food Safety Education (CPCFSE) – Be Food Safe Campaign
 American Nerd is a book by Benjamin Nugent whose book cover uses Whitney
 Delta Air Lines (used in logo and all branding)
 Sam's Club has used Whitney for advertising and promotions since their 2006 rebranding. In-store signage at Sam's Clubs that have been built or renovated since the rebranding are also typeset in Whitney.
 The University of British Columbia
Endeavor
 Mitt Romney used Whitney Semibold together with Mercury for his 2012 US Presidential election bid.
 ColdwellBankerHomes.com - one of the largest real estate broker websites launched in 2015 uses Whitney font 
 Castleton University (used on its website for texts of articles)
 St John Ambulance
 Canadian Imperial Bank of Commerce uses Whitney since its rebranding in 2021.
 Ascension (company)

References

External links 
 Whitney Font in the Hoefler & Co. catalog

Hoefler & Frere-Jones typefaces
Typefaces designed by Tobias Frere-Jones
Neo-grotesque sans-serif typefaces
Humanist sans-serif typefaces
Typefaces with text figures